Barry K. Jackson (9 August 1937 – 7 October 2019) was a rugby union international who represented England in 1970.

Rugby union career
Jackson was born in Manchester. He played his club rugby for Broughton Park and made his international debut on 21 March 1970 at Murrayfield in the Scotland vs England match. He played his final match for England on 18 April 1970 at Colombes in the France vs England match. Both matches ended in a loss for England. He also captained Lancashire.

Death

He died on 7 October 2019, at the age of 82.

References

1937 births
2019 deaths
English rugby union players
England international rugby union players
Lancashire County RFU players
Rugby union players from Manchester
Rugby union props